The Owen Sound North Stars are Junior "B" box lacrosse team from Owen Sound, Ontario, Canada.  The North Stars play in the OLA Junior B Lacrosse League.

History

The team now known as the Owen Sound NorthStars began life in 1973 as a Junior C team called the Satellites. They were the first junior lacrosse team in Owen Sound since the Chryslers folded in 1950 after a miserable season in which they went 1–13. 

Cy Lemon was a member of the Chryslers that year, and so it was only fitting that he stepped behind the bench to bring junior lacrosse back to the Scenic City. The Satellites opened play on the road in Windsor on May 13, losing 27–10 to a team that had gone to the Ontario final one year earlier. History does not record who scored the first goal in franchise history, but Paul Kazarian did record a hat trick that day. Inaugural captain Ivan McNabb scored twice, while Terry King also scored twice and added three assists. 

The Satellites had a respectable year in 1973, going 12–14 and finishing in fourth place in their division before being eliminated by Mississauga in the first round of the playoffs. 

By 1976, the Satellites were ready to contend. They finished first in the regular season with a 17–5 record and then swept two rounds of playoffs before being upset in the Ontario final by the Orangeville Stingers. But it was the last time Owen Sound would ever lose a Junior C playoff series. 

With Cubby Cruickshank behind the bench and league scoring champion Mark Kazarian leading the offence, the Satellites avenged that loss by sweeping Orangeville to win the 1977 championship. It was Owen Sound's first Ontario junior lacrosse championship since 1911, and it was also the first of three consecutive titles for the team – each of them won under a different name. 

The Satellites became the Forsyths in 1978 but the name change did not affect their fortunes. Mark Kazarian defended his scoring championship and once again Owen Sound swept the provincial final. 

In 1979, the team became known as the Rutherford Signmen, and once again they were the class of the Junior C league. Kazarian had graduated, but Randy McMillen and Dave Cruickshank more than picked up the slack, with “Rooster” succeeding “Kaz” as scoring champ and the team sailing to its third straight Ontario title. 

The Ontario Lacrosse Association merged the Junior B and Junior C leagues for the 1980 season. There were worries as to whether the Signmen would remain competitive in a tougher 16-team loop, but those concerns were dispelled when McMillen repeated as league scoring champ and Owen Sound sailed to the top of the standings and captured a fourth consecutive championship – knocking off the Toronto Beaches in a bitter series that was decided in overtime of the seventh game. For the first time, Owen Sound would compete for a national junior lacrosse championship – the Founders Cup. And although they were favoured to win the tournament in Baie Comeau, Quebec, two tough losses to Toronto and Edmonton forced the Signmen into a bronze-medal match, which they won. 

Owen Sound stumbled the following year, exiting the playoffs after one round despite Dave Cruickshank's scoring title, but the Scenic City squad bounced back in style in 1982. This time there would be no denying the Signmen, who finished first and lost only two of 18 playoff games, recapturing the Ontario championship and adding their first Canadian title at the Founders Cup in Port Coquitlam, B.C. Steve Baker and Cruickshank led the offence as the Signmen capped a perfect national tournament with a 13–10 win over Delta, B.C., in the gold-medal game. 

The team stayed competitive for a couple of years but entered a period of mediocrity that saw the Signmen bottom out in 1988, finishing last in their division and failing to make the playoffs. They rebounded in 1989 with the help of Jamie Grimoldby, who was named the league's rookie of the year, but were swept from the playoffs. That marked the end of Signs by Rutherford's long and fruitful sponsorship of the team. 

The Van Dolder family of Annan came on board as primary sponsor in 1990 and the team was renamed the Flying Dutchmen. There were still some struggles, with the team failing to make the playoffs again in 1992, but the pieces all fell into place the following year. 

Derek Forbes took over as coach and, with Grimoldby and goaltender Keith Peer rejoining the team after spending 1991 with Sarnia in Junior A ranks, the Dutchies were the best team in the league. They finished first and swept two playoff series before running into the Orillia Kings in the league final. It didn't look good for Owen Sound after Orillia won the first two games of the final, at which point the series was suspended so both teams could represent Ontario at the Founders Cup in Winnipeg. 

Orillia won again in their first tournament game, but Owen Sound was untouchable after that, taking its next three round-robin games by a combined score of 91–10 and setting up another showdown against the Kings. This time it was the Dutchies who were crowned victors after a 15–13 triumph, Grimoldby netting the winning goal with five minutes left. 

Owen Sound then returned home and finished off Orillia by capturing the next four games of the resumed Ontario championship series. Jeff Farmer's goal in double overtime of Game 6 gave the Dutchies their second title in nine days. 

The Dutchies put strong teams on the floor throughout much of the remainder of the 1990s before falling on hard times again. Highlights included Craig Ainsworth's scoring championship in 1998, when he was one of three Owen Sound players in the top four of league scoring, along with Jon Low and Bryan Kazarian.

The lean years of 1999 to 2003 gave way to several seasons where the club put up solid regular seasons (highlighted by a scoring title won by Adam Jones in 2007) but ran into difficulties in the playoffs. More recently, the team is in another rebuilding process. 

The Van Dolder family gave up its primary sponsorship in 2005, with RAM Trophies and Sportswear taking over for the next three years – a period of time that saw the team change its name to the Rams. Bluewater ProTeam followed as the main sponsor from 2009 to 2012 as the club changed its name one more time to NorthStars. 

Now with Garb & Gear Source for Sports joining up as the new primary sponsor and head coach Keith Peer adding the GM duties to his plate, the NorthStars look forward to resuming the winning tradition of Junior B lacrosse in Owen Sound. 

By Jonathon Jackson

#8 David Cruickshank
Dave Cruickshank was born in Owen Sound, where he played most of his minor lacrosse. In 1977, at age 15, he joined the Owen Sound Satellites, a Junior C team coached by his father, local lacrosse legend Cubby Cruickshank. It was the start of the most prolific career in Owen Sound junior lacrosse history. 

He scored 38 goals in his rookie season, racked up 57 goals the following year, and put up 73 tallies and 168 points in 1979. In all three seasons he was a key member of teams that won three consecutive Ontario Junior C championships. 

Now known as the Signmen, the team moved up to Junior B ranks in 1980. Cruickshank finished second in scoring with 42 goals and 95 points and was even deadlier in the postseason, scoring 53 goals and 107 playoff points as Owen Sound won a fourth straight provincial title. 

He captured his first scoring title in 1981 with 53 goals and 152 points, then captained the Signmen to Ontario and Canadian Junior B championships in 1982. He finished second in scoring that year with 60 goals and 135 points. 

In his final year of junior eligibility, Cruickshank was fourth in the scoring race with 61 goals and 134 points. 

He suited up in 232 games for the Satellites, Forsyths and Signmen, scoring at least 589 goals and 1,259 points – more than any other player in the history of Owen Sound junior lacrosse. His true statistics would be higher, but his scoring stats from the six games of the 1980 Founders Cup tournament were not recorded. 

Dave Cruickshank graduated to the Owen Sound North Stars in Senior B and Major ranks, winning a Presidents Cup in 1989, having also won a Minto Cup in Junior A with Whitby in 1980. He won the Senior B scoring championship in 1986, the year he set a record that still stands for most points in one game, with 17. 

He was inducted into the Ontario Lacrosse Hall of Fame in 1998 and the Owen Sound Sports Hall of Fame in 2001.

#12 Randy "Rooster" McMillen

Randy “Rooster” McMillen did a lot during his too-short life, winning a number of lacrosse championships and accolades. 

But nothing will likely ever compare to what he did during the 1979 season as a 19-year-old member of the Owen Sound Signmen. 

A product of the Owen Sound minor lacrosse system, McMillen saw action in some Junior C games in 1975 and 1976 before joining the Satellites full-time in 1977. He put up solid numbers as a rookie, scoring 41 times and adding 33 assists. 

He dropped back a little the next season, scoring 27 goals and 55 points, but he really turned it on in the playoffs, notching 41 goals as Owen Sound won its second straight Ontario championship. It turns out that was just a prelude to what he would do the following year. 

he Signmen, as the team became known that year, were simply the class of the league in 1979. Rooster began piling up the goals and points early on and, amazingly, got stronger as he went along. After scoring 29 times in the first 11 games of the season, he registered an unbelievable 76 goals and 66 assists in the final 13 contests. 

The last game was a tour de force. Battling for the scoring title with Peter O’Donnell of Guelph, McMillen scored 19 goals and 25 points to clinch the championship by a wide margin. He had finished the season with 105 goals, 103 assists and 208 points – Owen Sound junior scoring records that will undoubtedly stand forever. If that wasn't enough, he added 30 goals and 60 points in the postseason as the Signmen won their third straight Ontario championship. And he followed up in 1980 with another scoring title, helping the Signmen to their first Junior B crown and fourth consecutive provincial championship. 

Randy “Rooster” McMillen later won two Presidents Cups with the Owen Sound North Stars before eventually turning his interest and talents to masters lacrosse. He was 49 years old when he died suddenly on September 17, 2009. 

He was posthumously inducted into the Owen Sound Sports Hall of Fame in 2010.

Season-by-season results
Note: GP = Games played, W = Wins, L = Losses, T = Ties, Pts = Points, GF = Goals for, GA = Goals against

External links
The Bible of Lacrosse
Unofficial OLA Page
Owen Sound Jr B Lacrosse Webpage

Ontario Lacrosse Association teams
Sport in Owen Sound